The Ascension of Our Lord Chapel is a historic Russian Orthodox chapel in Karluk, Alaska. Now it is under Diocese of Alaska of the Orthodox Church in America

It is believed that an original church was built in Karluk in the 1700s.  The current church was built in 1888, with design and building "attributed to one Charles Smith Hursh".  Its architecture shared some with its contemporary Russian Orthodox church at Belkofski, but has "a more fully realized design for a small church, embodying eclectic features of one main stream of R. O. rural church design."

Its design was largely copied in the design of the Nativity of Our Lord Chapel in Ouzinkie, Alaska.

The church was listed on the National Register of Historic Places in 1980.

In 2021, the church was relocated from a bluff overlooking the river to prevent its destruction.

See also
National Register of Historic Places listings in Kodiak Island Borough, Alaska

References

External links 
 

Churches completed in 1888
Russian Orthodox church buildings in Alaska
Churches on the National Register of Historic Places in Alaska
Buildings and structures in Kodiak Island Borough, Alaska
Buildings and structures on the National Register of Historic Places in Kodiak Island Borough, Alaska
Russian Orthodox chapels